"Cold Beer Conversation" is a song recorded by American country music artist George Strait.  It was released as the second single from his 28th studio album of the same name.  The song was written by Al Anderson, Jimmy Yeary and Ben Hayslip.

Critical reception               
Kevin John Coyne of 'Country Universe' rated Cold Beer Conversation a B+. He states, the "new single captures the “take it as it comes” attitude toward life, but this time with somber resignation as the dominant feeling." "...things like realizing your parents are quickly aging or that your own youth isn't coming back around again." "Life passes by until it’s passed you by."

Chart and sales performance

References

External links

2015 singles
George Strait songs
Songs written by Al Anderson (NRBQ)
Songs written by Ben Hayslip
Songs written by Jimmy Yeary
Song recordings produced by Chuck Ainlay
MCA Nashville Records singles
2015 songs